"Angel of the Morning" is a popular song written by Chip Taylor, originally recorded by Evie Sands, but first charting by Merrilee Rush. The song has been covered by many artists including  P. P. Arnold, Connie Eaton, Mary Mason, Guys 'n' Dolls, Melba Montgomery, Olivia Newton-John, Bettye Swann and, most recognizably, by Juice Newton.

Origins, the original recording, and subsequent versions
The song was composed in 1967 by Chip Taylor, who said of it: "I wrote 'Angel of the Morning' after hearing the Rolling Stones song 'Ruby Tuesday' on the car radio when I was driving into New York City. I wanted to capture that kind of passion."

"Angel of the Morning" was originally offered to Connie Francis, but she turned it down because she thought that the love affair lyrical message was too risqué for her image.

Taylor produced the first recording of the song with Evie Sands, but the financial straits of Cameo-Parkway Records, which had Sands on their roster, led to a highly limited single release and no promotion.

The second recording was by UK vocalist Billie Davis made in 1967 by Danny Michaels for Lee Hazlewood's LHI label. P.P. Arnold provided backup vocals for this version and later released a version alone.

The song became a hit in 1968 through a recording by Merrilee Rush, made that January at American Sound Studios in Memphis, with Chips Moman and Tommy Cogbill producing. Rush had come to Memphis through the group she fronted, the Turnabouts, being the opening act for a Paul Revere and the Raiders tour. While in Memphis, the Raiders recorded the album Goin' to Memphis at American Sound Studios, an association which led to Rush's discovery by Tommy Cogbill, who had been hoping to find the right voice for "Angel of the Morning"—he had kept a tape of the demo of that song constantly in his pocket for several months.

Rush recorded the song and the tracks which would fill out her Angel of the Morning album with the American Sound house band, even though the single and the album would be credited to the group Merrilee Rush & the Turnabouts.

The single version was released in February 1968, and reached the Top 10 on the Billboard Hot 100 that June, peaking at No. 7, also reaching No. 1 in Canada, Australia, and New Zealand, and No. 4 in the Netherlands.  The song earned Rush a Grammy nomination for Best Contemporary-Pop Vocal Performance, Female. Rush recorded a new version of the song for her 1977 eponymous album release. (Rush's version of "Angel of the Morning" would be featured on the soundtrack of the 1999 film Girl, Interrupted, whose time frame is 1967 and 1968, in which author-composer Chip Taylor's niece Angelina Jolie had a starring role.)

In 1968, a rendition by P. P. Arnold, who had sung background on the 1967 Billie Davis version, reached No. 29 in the UK in August 1968.

In 1968, a rendition by Joya Landis was released by Treasure Isle in Jamaica and on Trojan Records in the UK (TR-622).

In 1969, soul artist Bettye Swann included a version of the song on her album The Soul View Now; released as a single, it reached No. 109 on the US charts.

In 1970 a rendition by Connie Eaton reached No. 34 on the Billboard C&W charts. In 1971 Nina Simone recorded the song for her album of cover versions Here Comes the Sun. In 1977, Mary Mason also had a UK Top 30 hit with her version, which was actually a medley of two Chip Taylor songs, "Angel of the Morning" and "Any Way That You Want Me", reaching No. 27.

In 1973 a rendition by Olivia Newton-John was recorded for her album Let Me Be There, which apparently did not hit the Billboard charts.

Also in 1977, the British act Guys 'n' Dolls had a hit in the Netherlands with the song, and their version reached No. 11 on the Dutch charts.

In 1978, a release by Melba Montgomery reached No. 22 on the Billboard C&W chart.

In 1994, a rendition of the song was released in a single of the Pretenders.

Versions by Chip Taylor
In 1972, Taylor released a version on Buddah 325. It reached No. 101 in the Record World survey.  
In 1996, Taylor released a version on the album Hit Man.
In 1999, a version by Taylor appeared on the KGSR fundraiser CD Broadcasts Vol. 7.
In 2004, Taylor released a version of the song with his singer-songwriter partner Carrie Rodriguez on the album of the same name.

Juice Newton version

The highest-charting and best-selling version in the United States was recorded and released in 1981 by country-rock singer Juice Newton for her album Juice. Newton re-interpreted the song at the suggestion of Steve Meyer, who promoted Capitol Records singles and albums to radio stations and felt a version of "Angel of the Morning" by Newton would be a strong candidate for airplay. Newton would state that she would never have thought of recording "Angel of the Morning," and even though she immediately recognized the song when Meyer played it for her (quote): "I [hadn't been] really aware of that song because...when [it] was popular I was listening to folk music and R&B and not pop, and that was a very pop song."

Newton's version reached No. 4 on the Billboard Hot 100, No. 22 on the Billboard country music chart, and spent three weeks at No. 1 on the Billboard adult contemporary chart in April of that year. The recording also earned Newton a Grammy nomination, in the same category as Rush's 1968 hit. More than 1 million units of Newton's single were sold in the United States, and it reached the Top 5 in a number of other countries, including Canada (number 1), Australia (number 2), South Africa (number 3), Switzerland (number 4) and New Zealand (number 5). Notably, Newton's video for "Angel of the Morning" was the first country music video aired on MTV, debuting the day the network launched, in 1981. In the UK, this recording reached No. 43 on the UK Singles Chart, marking the song's third appearance on that chart without becoming a truly major hit. Newton recorded the song again in 1998 for her The Trouble with Angels album.

Other charting versions
The song "Angel", released by reggae artist Shaggy, heavily uses the melody of "Angel of the Morning". It reached No. 1 on the Billboard  Hot 100 for the week ending March 31, 2001.

Swedish singer Jill Johnson released "Angel of the Morning", with lyrics in English, in 2007 from her album of cover versions, Music Row. This version peaked at No. 30 at the Swedish singles chart.

Other uses
 The Merrilee Rush version of the song is featured in the soundtrack of the films Girl, Interrupted (as noted above) and Violet and Daisy, as well as in the NBC Television series The Blacklist.
 Rush's version is also played during a scene in the 1978 film Fingers, where it is used to accentuate the conflicted nature of the main character played by Harvey Keitel.
 Rush's version is referenced in the Stephen King novella The Langoliers, from the collection Four Past Midnight.
 The song was performed live by Chrissie Hynde in a 1995 episode of Friends titled "The One with the Baby on the Bus," and that version also appears in that show's soundtrack album. (Though released as a single, it did not chart.)
 The song plays a central role in Graeme Simsion's 2016 novel The Best of Adam Sharp.
Juice Newton's version is heard during Drew Barrymore's first scene in the film Charlie's Angels, in the film Charlie Wilson's War (in which it is also sung by Emily Blunt), the opening titles of Deadpool, in the film It Chapter Two, and the endings of The Meddler and Promising Young Woman. It is also featured in the first season of HBO's True Detective, in episode 11 of the fifth season of NBC's Superstore, and in the episode "Anne" during the eighth season of NBC's The Blacklist.
The Toyota Highlander "Kid Cave" commercial, aired from late 2010, features a young boy who is embarrassed by his parents's singing of the song while he is riding with them in a car.

Chart history

Weekly charts

Merrilee Rush and the Turnabouts version

Year-end charts

Juice Newton version

Certifications

See also
List of number-one singles in Australia during the 1960s
List of number-one singles in 1968 (New Zealand)
List of number-one adult contemporary singles of 1981 (U.S.)

References

External links
Newton 1981 U.S. single release info Discogs

1967 songs
1967 singles
1968 singles
1981 singles
1993 singles
2001 singles
Bell Records singles
Capitol Records singles
Cameo Records singles
Connie Eaton songs
Elisabeth Andreassen songs
Jill Johnson songs
Juice Newton songs
Guys 'n' Dolls songs
Melba Montgomery songs
Number-one singles in Australia
Number-one singles in New Zealand
Pop ballads
Song recordings produced by Chips Moman
Song recordings produced by Richard Landis
Songs about casual sex
Songs written by Chip Taylor